ASP.NET is an open-source, server-side web-application framework designed for web development to produce dynamic web pages. It was developed by Microsoft to allow programmers to build dynamic web sites, applications and services. The name stands for Active Server Pages Network Enabled Technologies.

It was first released in January 2002 with version 1.0 of the .NET Framework and is the successor to Microsoft's Active Server Pages (ASP) technology. ASP.NET is built on the Common Language Runtime (CLR), allowing programmers to write ASP.NET code using any supported .NET language. The ASP.NET SOAP extension framework allows ASP.NET components to process SOAP messages.

ASP.NET's successor is ASP.NET Core. It is a re-implementation of ASP.NET as a modular web framework, together with other frameworks like Entity Framework. The new framework uses the new open-source .NET Compiler Platform (codename "Roslyn") and is cross platform. ASP.NET MVC, ASP.NET Web API, and ASP.NET Web Pages (a platform using only Razor pages) have merged into a unified MVC 6.

Programming models 
ASP.NET supports a number of programming models for building web applications:
 ASP.NET Web Forms – A framework for building modular pages out of components, with UI events being processed server-side.
 ASP.NET MVC – allows for building web pages using the model–view–controller design pattern.
 ASP.NET Web Pages – A lightweight syntax for adding dynamic code and data access directly inside HTML markup.
 ASP.NET Web API – A framework for building Web APIs on top of the .NET Framework.
 ASP.NET WebHooks – Implements the Webhook pattern for subscribing to and publishing events via HTTP.
 SignalR – A real-time communications framework for bi-directional communication between client and server.

Other ASP.NET extensions include:
 ASP.NET Handler – Components that implement the System.Web.IHttpHandler interface. Unlike ASP.NET Pages, they have no HTML-markup file, no events and other supporting. All they have is a code-file (written in any .NET-compatible language) that writes some data to the server HTTP response. HTTP handlers are similar to ISAPI extensions.
 ASP.NET AJAX – An extension with both client-side as well as server-side components for writing ASP.NET pages that incorporate Ajax functionality.
 ASP.NET Dynamic Data – A scaffolding extension to build data driven web applications.

IIS integrated pipeline 
On IIS 6.0 and lower, pages written using different versions of the ASP framework cannot share session state without the use of third-party libraries. This does not apply to ASP.NET and ASP applications running side by side on IIS 7. With IIS 7.0, modules may be run in an integrated pipeline that allows modules written in any language to be executed for any request.

Third-party frameworks 
It is not essential to use the standard Web forms development model when developing with ASP.NET. Noteworthy frameworks designed for the platform include:
 Base One Foundation Component Library (BFC) is RAD framework for building .NET database and distributed computing applications.
 DotNetNuke is an open-source solution that provides both a web application framework and a content management system that allows for advanced extensibility through modules, skins, and providers.
 Castle MonoRail, an open-source MVC framework with an execution model similar to Ruby on Rails. The framework is commonly used with Castle ActiveRecord, an ORM layer built on NHibernate.

Versions 
The ASP.NET releases history tightly correlates with the .NET Framework releases:

Other implementations 
The Mono Project supports "everything in .NET 4.5 except WPF, WWF, and with limited WCF and limited ASP.NET 4.5 async stack." ASP.NET can be run with Mono using one of three options: Apache hosting using the mod_mono module, FastCGI hosting, and XSP.

See also 
ELMAH (Error Logging Modules and Handlers), an ASP.NET debugging tool

References

Citations

General sources

External links 

 
 
 ASP.NET on MSDN
 Some of new features in ASP.NET 4 and vs 2010 IDE

 
Free and open-source software
Microsoft application programming interfaces
Microsoft free software
Microsoft Visual Studio
Software using the Apache license
Template engines
Web frameworks